Hart Pomerantz is a Canadian lawyer and television personality, best known for his collaboration with Saturday Night Live producer Lorne Michaels in The Hart and Lorne Terrific Hour and to Canadian audiences for his many appearances as a regular on This Is the Law, where he brought a unique sense of irreverent humour to the show. He also hosted the 1974 quiz show Double Up and the short-lived 1998 talk show Grumps.

His brother Earl Pomerantz also was known for television comedy.

Bibliography

References

External links 
 
 
 Blog posting on Pomerantz by Steve Paikin; includes TV interview from the latter's The Agenda with Steve Paikin show

Canadian television personalities
Living people
Lawyers in Ontario
The New Yorker people
University of Toronto alumni
Year of birth missing (living people)